Soundscraper is the eighth studio album by Praga Khan. It was released in 2006.

Track listing
 "Heal Me" – 7:30	
 "We Fuel Our Own High" – 3:53	
 "Pick-Up Truck" – 5:38	
 "Right or Wrong" – 4:52	
 "Don't U Tell Me" – 4:29	
 "Picasso’s Dream" – 6:31	
 "Earth & Space" – 3:40	
 "United in Love" – 4:39	
 "Sweet Angel Ice" – 3:38	
 "China Lady" – 6:41	
 "You Break My Heart" – 4:22

Notes

2006 albums
Praga Khan albums